Freedom at Midnight (1975) is a non-fiction book by Larry Collins and Dominique Lapierre about the events around the Indian independence movement and partition. It details the last year of the British Raj, from 1947 to 1948, beginning with the appointment of Lord Mountbatten of Burma as the last viceroy of British India, and ending with the death and funeral of Mahatma Gandhi.

The book is told in a casual style, similar to the authors' previous works, Is Paris Burning? and O Jerusalem!.

Content
The book provides a detailed account of the last year of the British Raj; the reactions of princely states towards independence, including descriptions of the colourful and extravagant lifestyles of the Indian princes; the partition of British India (into India and Pakistan) on religious grounds; and the bloodshed that followed.

There is a description of Shimla, the British summertime capital in the Himalayas, and how supplies were carried up steep mountains by porters each year. Also covered in detail are the events leading to the assassination of Mahatma Gandhi, as well as the life and motives of Jawaharlal Nehru and Muhammad Ali Jinnah.

Regarding partition, the book—providing maps of Punjab, Bengal, and Kashmir—relates that the crucial maps setting the boundary separating India and Pakistan were drawn that year by Cyril Radcliffe, who had not visited India before being appointed as the chairman of the Boundary Commission. The book depicts the fury of both Hindus and Muslims, misled by their communal leaders, during the partition; and the biggest mass slaughter in the history of India, as millions of people were uprooted by the partition and tried to migrate by train, oxcart, and on foot to new places designated for their particular religious group. Many migrants fell victim to bandits and religious extremists of both dominant religions. One incident quoted describes a canal in Lahore that ran with blood and floating bodies.

Background
The authors interviewed many who were there during the events, including a focus on Lord Mountbatten of Burma. They subsequently wrote a book based in particular upon their research on the British officer, titled Mountbatten and the Partition of India, containing interviews with Mountbatten, and a selection of papers that were in his possession.

Response 
Freedom at Midnight aroused controversy for its portrayal of the British expatriates, the native rulers of India, and members of India's first cabinet. James Cameron described it as the result of deep research into events often neglected by other historians.

This book was one of the inspirations for the 2017 film Viceroy's House.

This book was one of the inspirations for the 2000 film Hey Ram.

References

1975 non-fiction books
Indian independence movement
History books about India
Books about British India
Books about foreign relations of the United Kingdom
William Collins, Sons books